Tropicibacter phthalicicus is a Gram-negative, phthalate-degrading and aerobic bacterium from the genus of Tropicibacter which has been isolated from seawater from the Ishigaki Island in Japan.

References 

Rhodobacteraceae
Bacteria described in 2012